La Cocha Lagoon is a  volcanic crater lake located within the Pasto Municipality in Nariño, Colombia.

La Cocha Lagoon is Colombia's second largest inland body of water after Lake Tota in terms of surface area.

Wildlife
La Cocha Lagoon surrounds La Corota Island Flora Sanctuary which is home to mammals such as mountain tapir, northern pudu and spectacled bears, and bird species like grebes, golden peck duck, snipes, and andean ducks.

Important plant species include frailejon, Schoenoplectus californicus, and Juncus effusus.

References

Cocha
Ramsar sites in Colombia